Fernando Ezequiel "Pino" Solanas (16 February 1936 – 6 November 2020) was an Argentine film director, screenwriter, and politician. His films include; La hora de los hornos (The Hour of the Furnaces) (1968), Tangos: el exilio de Gardel (1985), Sur (1988), El viaje (1992), La nube (1998) and Memoria del saqueo (2004), among many others. He was National Senator representing the Autonomous City of Buenos Aires for six years, from 2013 to 2019.

Solanas studied theatre, music, and law. In 1962, he directed his first short feature Seguir andando and in 1968 he covertly produced and directed his first long feature film La Hora de los Hornos, a documentary on neo-colonialism and violence in Latin America. The film won several international awards and was screened around the world. Solanas won the Grand Jury Prize and the Critics Award at the Venice Film Festival and the Prix de la mise en scène at the Cannes Film Festival. In 1999 he was the President of the Jury at the 21st Moscow International Film Festival. He was awarded a special Honorary Golden Bear at the 2004 Berlin Film Festival. He collaborated with tango composer and musician Ástor Piazzolla on the soundtracks for various movies.

Background

Solanas was at the forefront of the Grupo Cine Liberación which shook Argentine cinema during the 1970s, developing its social conscience and political voice. He was active in the campaign to support Perón. Threatened by right-wing forces in the 1970s, one of his actors was assassinated and he himself was almost kidnapped.

Together with Octavio Getino, Solanas wrote the manifesto "Toward a Third Cinema". The idea of a political Third Cinema, opposed to Hollywood cinema and European auteur cinema, inspired film makers in many so-called developing countries.

Solanas went into exile in Paris in 1976, only returning to Argentina with the arrival of democracy in 1983.

Political career
Solanas continued to make political films and was an outspoken critic of Carlos Menem, the Argentine President. Three days after such a public criticism, on 21 May 1991, Solanas was shot six times in his legs. Those responsible were never caught but Solanas always thought the Menem was behind it. Despite dealing with the attack and disability, Solanas became even more involved in politics and stood to be a Senator for Buenos Aires, receiving 7% of the vote in 1992. A year later he was elected a National Deputy for the Frente Grande list, although he left the party after a year.

Solanas continued to write and direct, including the 2005 film La Dignidad de los Nadies and the 2008 film La última estación. His son, Juan Solanas, is also a noted film director.

In October 2007, Solanas was a presidential candidate in the 2007 Argentine general election for the Authentic Socialist Party. He became the 5th most voted candidate, with 1.58% of the vote.

In 2009, Solanas was elected as a National Deputy for the city of Buenos Aires in the June 28th parliamentary elections, as his party Proyecto Sur attained the second largest political representation in the city by collecting 24.2% of the votes. In 2013, Solanas was elected National Senator, representing Buenos Aires City from 2013 to 2019.

In 2018 Solanas was vehemently for the legalization of abortion, claiming that sexual pleasure is a "fundamental human right".

In 2019, following the end of his term as senator, he was appointed as Argentina's ambassador to UNESCO; he served in the position until his death from COVID-19 in Neuilly-sur-Seine, France, on 6 November 2020, during the COVID-19 pandemic in France.

Filmography 
 Seguir andando (1962) (short)
 Reflexión ciudadana (1963) (short)
 La hora de los hornos (The Hour of the Furnaces) (1968)
 Argentina, Mayo de 1969: los caminos de la liberación (1969)
 Perón, la revolución justicialista (1971)
 Perón: actualización política y doctrinaria para la toma del poder (1971)
 Los hijos de fierro (1972)
 La mirada de los otros (1980)  Filmed in Paris, France
 El exilio de Gardel (Tangos) (1985)
 Sur (1988)
 El viaje (1992)
 La nube (1998)
 Afrodita, el sabor del amor (2001)
 Memoria del saqueo (2004)
 La dignidad de los nadies (2005)
 Argentina latente (2007)
 La próxima estación (2008)
 La tierra sublevada (2009)

Accolades

Quotes
"The possibility of making a new cinema completely outside the system depends on whether or not filmmakers can transform themselves from 'directors' into total filmmakers. And no one can become a total filmmaker without being a film technician, without being capable of handling the production."
 "We realized that the important thing was not the film itself but that which the film provoked."

References

Further reading
Fernando Solanas and Octavio Getino, "Towards a Third Cinema" in: Movies and Methods. An Anthology, edited by Bill Nichols, University of Arizona Press 1976, pp 44–64
Jessica Stites Mor. Transition Cinema: Political Filmmaking and the Argentine Left since 1968. Pittsburgh, 2012.
Stoffel Debusyere and John Akomfrah, "Fernando Solanas (1936-2020)" Sabzian 9.11.20.

External links

Towards a Third Cinema Manifesto
 

1936 births
2020 deaths
Deaths from the COVID-19 pandemic in France
People from Vicente López Partido
Members of the Argentine Chamber of Deputies elected in Buenos Aires
Members of the Argentine Senate for Buenos Aires
Argentine film directors
Candidates for President of Argentina
Shooting survivors
Proyecto Sur politicians
Broad Front (Argentina) politicians
Permanent Delegates of Argentina to UNESCO
Cannes Film Festival Award for Best Director winners
Honorary Golden Bear recipients
Argentine exiles